Ba Kaung (1921 - 8 July 2003) was a Burmese activist. He was one of the most prominent student activists of post-independent Burma. In 1957, he established the Progressive Student Force along with fellow activists, a rival union of the government-backed Democratic Student Organization and also served as a leader for the Communist Party of Burma. 
 
He went on to join the civil service as a government high school teacher in the 1960s. Ba Kaung was also an editor of the semi-government-run Pyinnya Tansaung magazine in the 1990s.

Notes

References

Burmese civil servants
1921 births
2003 deaths
People from Sagaing Region
Burmese activists